Chawridge Bourne is a  biological Site of Special Scientific Interest in Berkshire, England Part of the site is a  nature reserve called Chawridge Bank, which is managed by the Berkshire, Buckinghamshire and Oxfordshire Wildlife Trust.

Etymology

The name Chawridge is first attested in a charter of 942, which includes the Old English phrase "on ceawan hrycges hagan" ("to the enclosure of Ceawa's ridge"), where Ceawa is a personal name attested only here and in the place-names East and West Challow. As well as appearing in Chawridge Bourne, the name also appears in the neighbouring sites of Chawridge Manor Farm, Charriage Lane, Chawridge Mead, and Chawridge Gorse.

Ecology

This linear site is named after the stream called Chawridge Bourne, which runs through it. Half of it is unimproved grassland, which is managed by sheep grazing. There are also areas of scrub and broadleaved woodland. On the east side there is an ancient parish boundary hedge which has diverse tree flora.

Fauna

The site has the following animals

Mammals

Micromys minutus

Birds
Alauda
Great spotted woodpecker
Eurasian blackcap
Lesser whitethroat

Invertebrates
Polyommatus icarus
Erynnis tages
Pyrgus malvae

Flora

The site has the following flora:

Trees
Crataegus monogyna
Prunus spinosa
Fraxinus
Maple
Quercus robur
Malus sylvestris
Sorbus torminalis

Plants
Arrhenatherum elatius
Holcus lanatus
Dactylis glomerata
Deschampsia cespitosa
Festuca rubra
Achillea ptarmica
Genista tinctoria
Hordeum secalinum
Ophioglossum vulgatum
Primula veris
Silaum silaus
Senecio erucifolius
Carex pallescens
Potentilla anglica
Succisa pratensis
Ranunculus auricomus
Phyllitis scolopendrium
Polystichum setiferum
Centaurea nigra
Leontodon taraxacoides

References
 

Sites of Special Scientific Interest in Berkshire
Berkshire, Buckinghamshire and Oxfordshire Wildlife Trust
Warfield
Winkfield